The County of Stettler No. 6 is a municipal district in central Alberta, Canada.

Geography

Communities and localities 
The following urban municipalities are surrounded by the Stettler County No. 6.
Cities
none
Towns
Stettler
Villages
Big Valley
Donalda
Summer villages
Rochon Sands
White Sands

The following hamlets are located within the County of Stettler No. 6.
Hamlets
Botha (dissolved from village status on September 1, 2017)
Byemoor
Endiang
Erskine
Gadsby (dissolved from village status on February 1, 2020)
Nevis
Red Willow

The following localities are located within the County of Stettler No. 6.
Localities 
Anderson Addition
Bolin Subdivision
Caprona
Fenn
Gopher Head
Hackett
Hartshorn
Heart Lake
Leahurst
Leo
Nevis Junction
Oberlin
Repp Addition
Repp Subdivision
Sabine
Scollard
Warden
Warden Junction
Willowglen Estates
Other places
Cordel

Demographics 

In the 2016 Census of Population conducted by Statistics Canada, the County of Stettler No. 6 had a population of 5,322 living in 1,850 of its 2,137 total private dwellings, a  change from its 2011 population of 5,103.

See also 
List of communities in Alberta
List of municipal districts in Alberta

References

External links

 
Stettler